A mason's mark is an engraved symbol often found on dressed stone in buildings and other public structures.

In stonemasonry

Regulations issued in Scotland in 1598 by James VI's Master of Works, William Schaw, stated that on admission to the guild, every mason had to enter his name and his mark in a register.  There are three types of marks used by stonemasons.

Banker marks were made on stones before they were sent to be used by the walling masons. These marks served to identify the banker mason who had prepared the stones to their paymaster. This system was employed only when the stone was paid for by measure, rather than by time worked. For example, the 1306 contract between Richard of Stow, mason, and the Dean and Chapter of Lincoln Cathedral, specified that the plain walling would be paid for by measure, and indeed banker marks are found on the blocks of walling in this cathedral. Conversely, the masons responsible for walling the eastern parts of Exeter Cathedral were paid by the week, and consequently few banker marks are found on this part of the cathedral. Banker marks make up the majority of masons' marks, and are generally what are meant when the term is used without further specification.
Assembly marks were used to ensure the correct installation of important pieces of stonework. For example, the stones on the window jambs in the chancel of North Luffenham church in Rutland are each marked with a Roman numeral, directing the order in which the stones were to be installed.
 Quarry stones were used to identify the source of a stone, or occasionally the quality.

In Freemasonry
Freemasonry, a fraternal order that uses an analogy to stonemasonry for much of its structure, also makes use of marks.  A Freemason who takes the degree of Mark Master Mason will be asked to create his own Mark, as a type of unique signature or identifying badge.  Some of these can be quite elaborate.

Gallery of mason's marks

See also
 Benchmark (surveying)
 Builder's signature
 Carpenter's mark
 House mark
 Merchant's mark

References

Further reading

External links

Examples of Mason's marks
Site detailing Mason's Marks in Scotland

Freemasonry
Masonic symbolism
Stonemasonry
Symbols
Inscriptions